Enele "Henry" Tuilagi (born 12 August 1976) is a Samoan former professional rugby league and rugby union footballer who played in the 1990s, 2000s and 2010s. He appeared ten times for his national team Samoa and played club rugby in Italy, France and England.

In 2002, Tuilagi spent a year playing in the Italian Super 10 competition for Parma, where his younger brother Alesana had joined him. He appeared for Parma against London Wasps at High Wycombe in the first round of the European Challenge Cup, and then at Caerphilly in the quarter final of the same competition in January 2003. The No.8 was first included in the Samoa squad for the 2000 Pacific Rim Championship, but had to wait another two years for his test debut against Fiji in Apia, Samoa in June 2002. Both Fereti and Alesana joined him in the international team later in the month, when all three brothers played together in the World Cup qualifier against Fiji at Nadi.

Tuilagi made 24 first team appearances during his first season with the Leicester Tigers. He scored a try on his debut match for the Tigers against London Irish. He soon established himself firmly in the Tigers line-up, but his next season was cut short with a broken leg in the final home game against the London Wasps.

The Tuilagi family have strong connections with Leicester Tigers; Henry's brother Alesana (Alex) played for Leicester before moving to play in Japan, and his brothers Fereti (Freddie), Anitelea (Andy) and Sanele Vavae Tuilagi are former players. His brother Manu played for Leicester until 2020. Manu began his first season with Leicester in the 2010–11 Aviva Premiership and made his debut for England against Wales in August 2011.

Tuilagi made a real impact in the back row after joining his elder brother Fereti when at Leicester. He made 24 first team appearances in his first season, scoring a try on his debut in the opening game against London Irish, and subsequently consolidated his position both in the team and as a favourite of the fans. His 2004/05 season was cut short, however, when he suffered a broken leg in the final home Premiership match against London Wasps in April. He then broke his arm the next year when playing against Northampton.

In 2007 Tuilagi moved to France to play for Perpignan in the Top 14. His son Posolo Tuilagi (born 2004) also joined Perpignan in 2022.

Tuilagi was also capped for Samoa at Rugby League in 1999.

Tuilagi was known for his enormous strength, and is one of the strongest athletes in sporting history whose career was not dedicated to powerlifting as an end in itself. At his peak, he bench pressed 250 kg (551 lb) raw for several reps.

In July 2020 following the death of French player Franck Lascassies Tuilagi went public about his battle with depression.

References

External links
 USAP profile on fr.usap.fr (fr)
 Henry Tuilagi on tigers.co.uk
 Manu Samoa supporters website
 Pacific Islanders Rugby Teams supporters website

1976 births
Living people
Expatriate rugby union players in England
Expatriate rugby union players in France
Expatriate rugby union players in Italy
Leicester Tigers players
Pacific Islanders rugby union players
People from Fa'asaleleaga
Samoa international rugby union players
Samoa national rugby league team players
Samoan sportspeople
Samoan expatriate rugby union players
Samoan expatriate sportspeople in England
Samoan expatriate sportspeople in France
Samoan expatriate sportspeople in Italy
Samoan rugby league players
Samoan rugby union players
Tuilagi family
USA Perpignan players